Cihangir is a neighborhood in the Beyoğlu district in Istanbul, Turkey.

Cihangir is also the Turkish form of the Persian name Jahangir, meaning "conqueror of the world". It may refer to:

 Şehzade Cihangir (1531–1553), Ottoman prince, son of Suleiman the Magnificent, and the namesake of the neighborhood
 Cihangir Akşit (born 1953), Turkish military officer and Director of the NATO Standardization Agency
 Cihangirzade İbrahim Bey (1874–1948), Turkish military officer, statesman, and administrator
 Epicho, a village in Northern Cyprus better known by its Turkish name Cihangir

See also
 Jahangir (name)